This is a list of electoral results for the Electoral district of Narracan in Victorian state elections.

Members for Narracan

Election results

Elections in the 2020s

Elections in the 2010s

Elections in the 2000s

Elections in the 1990s

Elections in the 1980s 

 Narracan became a notionally Labor seat in the redistribution before the election. However, the Liberal candidate managed to win it back.

Elections in the 1970s

Elections in the 1960s

References

 

Victoria (Australia) state electoral results by district